Vanessa Greene (September 15, 1954 – December 13, 2017) was a TV producer. She served as a producer or executive producer on several made-for-television films, including Stolen Women: Captured Hearts (1997) starring Janine Turner, Monday After the Miracle (1998) starring Roma Downey, Under the Influence (1986) starring Andy Griffith, and Wait Till Your Mother Gets Home! (1983) starring Paul Michael Glaser. She also co-wrote the teleplay for the Star Trek: The Next Generation episode "The Loss" with Alan J. Adler.

She married British director David Greene in 1975. They divorced in 1981.

Selected filmography
 Murder at 75 Birch (1998) TV movie, producer
 Before He Wakes (1998) TV movie, supervising producer
 Our Son, the Matchmaker (1996) TV movie, co-executive producer
 Nothing Lasts Forever (1995) TV miniseries, producer
 Search for Grace (1994) TV movie, producer
 With Hostile Intent (1993) TV movie, producer
 Deadly Desire (1991) TV movie, producer
 Secret Witness (1988) TV movie, producer

References

External links 
 
 

1954 births
2017 deaths
American film producers
American television producers
American women television producers
American women film producers
21st-century American women
Film people from London